Marthoman Cheriyapally is a Jacobite Church located in Kothamangalam town of Ernakulam district, Kerala, India. The church is believed to have been established in 1455 by 18 families who separated from Marth Maryam Valiyapally. The church is famous for the feast of Mor Baselios Yeldo, a Syriac Orthodox saint who arrived in Kothamangalam. He is entombed in the altar room of this church.

History 

The present region of Kothamangalam was historically known as Malakhachira (മാലാഖച്ചിറ, which literally means "Place of the Angel"). According to church history, the Syriac Orthodox Bishop, St. Baselios Yeldo Maphrian reached the church in the year 1685, on 11th of Kanni month of the Malayalam calendar.

Yeldo and Basil 
The name Yelda (East Syriac) / Yeldo (West Syriac) means Christmas. Yelda/Yeldo lent (Nativity lent) starts 15 December till 25 December. Various spellings are used to write Yeldo (യെൽദൊ) in English (Yeldho, Eldho, Eldo).

Basil is the short form for Baselios, a Greek word that literally means "king" or "emperor", and is used to refer to St. Basil of Caesarea.

Gallery

See also 

 Baselios Yeldo
 Marth Mariam Valiyapally Kothamangalam

References

External links

 Cheriapally.org

Churches in Kothamangalam
Malankara Orthodox Syrian church buildings
Churches completed in 1455
15th-century churches in India
15th-century Oriental Orthodox church buildings
Religious organizations established in the 1450s